Sol Invictus (Latin for Unconquered Sun) is the seventh studio album by American rock band Faith No More, released on May 19, 2015. It was Faith No More's first studio album following 1997's Album of the Year, marking the longest gap between two studio albums in their career, and their first release on Reclamation Records. Sol Invictus was also the band's first album since 1992's Angel Dust to feature the same lineup as its predecessor.

The album marked the group's fifth collaboration with longtime producer Matt Wallace, this time helping with the final mix rather than a more substantial producing role.

Background
On February 24, 2009 after months of speculation and rumors, Faith No More announced they would be reforming with a line-up identical to the Album of the Year era, embarking on a reunion tour called The Second Coming Tour. To coincide with the band's reunion tour, Rhino released the sixth Faith No More compilation, The Very Best Definitive Ultimate Greatest Hits Collection, a double album that includes their hit singles and b sides & rarities, in the UK on June 8. Faith No More then played in major European festivals including, Download Festival in the UK in June, Hurricane and Southside festivals in Germany, Greenfield Festival in Switzerland, Hove Festival in Norway and Roskilde Festival in Denmark, among other dates. The tour continued into 2010 with appearances at the Soundwave Festival in Australian cities throughout February and March. During their tour, the band added covers to their repertoire including "Switch" by Siouxsie and the Banshees.

After an eleven-month hiatus, Faith No More played four shows in South America in November 2011. On the first date (November 8, 2011), the band played a "mystery song" - later confirmed as "Matador" - which led to speculation of new material. They played Sonisphere France on July 7, 2012.

In a January 2013 interview, Mike Patton suggested that the band would not remain active beyond the reunion tour, stating that "it's sort of petered out" and the band was "maybe a little too conscious for [their] own good." In July 2013, Billy Gould hinted the band may record new material in the future, saying "We will do something again only when all members are with the focus on that, and ready for the challenge. This is not the time... yet." 
On July 4, 2014, Faith No More played their first show in two years at Hyde Park in London, supporting Black Sabbath. At that show, Faith No More debuted two new songs "Motherfucker" and "Superhero" (also known by fans as "Leader of Men"). On September 2, Bill Gould revealed to Rolling Stone that Faith No More had begun work on a new album. On February 10, 2015 the band announced the title of their new album, Sol Invictus, and was set to be released on May 19, 2015.

Touring

Following the announcement of the album, Faith No More played a two show run in Tokyo, Japan, before flying to Australia for the 2015 edition of the  Soundwave Festival. The festival's lineup featured Hollywood Undead, Incubus, Marilyn Manson, Ministry, New Found Glory, Slipknot, Soundgarden and Steel Panther, among others. It lasted from February 21 to February 28, and would turn out to be the last edition held. Incubus vocalist Brandon Boyd has since spoken of his enjoyment at getting to play with Faith No More at Soundwave, as it is a band he has frequently cited as an influence.

From April 2015 to mid-May 2015, the band embarked on a tour of North America. During these North American shows, Faith No More were supported by the bands Flattbush, Ho99o9, Le Butcherettes, Philm and Urinals. The band subsequently went on a tour of Europe from late May to June, then returning to the United States for another run of shows between July and September. For the remainder of September, the band toured South America, an area which they had neglected during the Album of the Year Tour in 1997–98. Touring for Sol Invictus was finished by the end of 2015, with the band's final performance that year occurring at the Aftershock Festival in Sacramento, California on October 25. Artists that Faith No More shared bills with during the Sol Invictus tour include Babymetal, Dir En Grey, Emmure, Gojira, Limp Bizkit, Meshuggah, Metallica and Three Days Grace. Faith No More briefly reconvened in August 2016 for two shows with Chuck Mosley, to celebrate the reissue of their 1985 debut We Care a Lot. To date, these remain the band's most recent performances, in addition to being their final shows with Mosley, who passed away in November 2017.

Promotion
"Motherfucker" was the first single to be released from Sol Invictus. It was released on November 28, 2014 exclusively on 7" vinyl to coincide with Record Store Day's Black Friday. It was later released digitally on December 5, 2014. The "Superhero" single was initially scheduled to be released on March 17, 2015 on 7" vinyl, but was delayed to March 23 after the pressing plants suffered from adverse weather effects. A free preview of the song was made available March 1, 2015 through several media outlets, including Marvel.com, YouTube via Ipecac Recordings, and on BBC Radio 1's Rock Show. "Superhero" was also able to be purchased from iTunes later that day. BBC Radio 6 Music confirmed that "Sunny Side Up" will be the next single.

Music videos were made for "Sunny Side Up" and "Separation Anxiety" during 2015. The "Sunny Side Up" video, directed by Joe Lynch, is set in a nursing home, while "Separation Anxiety" uses footage from the 1955 horror film Dementia. On September 19, 2016, Faith No More released a preview for a music video for "Cone of Shame" that was written & directed by Goce Cvetanovski.

Style
On Sol Invictus, the band drops the slap bass and rap techniques of prior releases, instead utilizing middle-range vocals. Musically, the album continues the band's tradition of experimenting in various genres, including post-punk, heavy metal, ska, and even dirges.

Reception

Sol Invictus sold over 200,000 copies in its first two months of release according to the United World Charts. It has received a positive reception from professional critics. Aggregate review website Metacritic assigned a "generally favorable" score of 79 out of 100 based on reviews from 25 critics. In their May 2015 review, Drowned in Sound commented, "as ever, Patton remains FNM’s big draw and the singer is in typically extraordinary form. His lyrics are a ragtag conveyer belt of leprechauns, superheroes, matadors, motherfuckers, solitary tap-dancers, salad-bar rioters and sunburn victims. On such subjects, he spits, screams, shrills, wails, whines, whispers, croons, coughs, rages and... does he rap? He talks a bit, that's for sure. It's hard to believe there was a time when Anthony Kiedis could accuse this gentleman of ripping off his own laboured vocal style. Oh, what vast creative leaps Faith No More made in the years that followed 1989's The Real Thing."  Kevin Cogill of The Antiquiet compared the album's more aggressive sounds to Helmet's 1997 album Aftertaste.

Legacy and accolades
The album was included at number 5 on Rock Sounds top 50 releases of 2015 list. Rolling Stone ranked it second on their list of the 20 best metal albums of 2015. 

In June 2015, the album won a Metal Hammer Golden God Award for Best Album.

Track listing

Personnel
Faith No More
 Mike Bordin – drums
 Roddy Bottum – keyboards, vocals
 Billy Gould – bass
 Jon Hudson – guitar
 Mike Patton – vocals

Production
 Billy Gould – producer, recording engineer
 Matt Wallace – mixing engineer
 Maor Appelbaum – mastering engineer

Charts

Weekly charts

Year-end charts

References
Citations

Sources

 

Faith No More albums
2015 albums
Ipecac Recordings albums